Rhamphosuchus ("Beak crocodile") is an extinct genus of gavialid crocodylians. It lived during the Pliocene and its fossils have been found in two regions; the Siwalik Hills of Pakistan and India as well as the Sindh region of Pakistan. Its type species is Rhamphosuchus crassidens, which is only known from incomplete sets of fossils, mostly teeth and skulls. Four species traditionally placed in the genus Gavialis may be included as well.

Overview

However, a more recent study suggests that the animal may have been 8–11 m (26 to 36 ft) in length, and therefore is not the largest known crocodylian. Another crocodylian, Purussaurus, from the Miocene of Peru and Brazil, is known from an equally incomplete fossil set. It is estimated to have been similar in length to the initial estimates at approximately 12 m (about 40ft). However, this would mean that it would have been somewhat larger in size if the more recent size estimates for Rhamphosuchus are correct. If the most recent estimate is correct, then several other extinct crocodylians also surpassed Rhamphosuchus in length, such as the Late Cretaceous alligatoroid Deinosuchus, the Early Cretaceous pholidosaurid Sarcosuchus, the Miocene gavialid Gryposuchus and the strange planktivorous Mourasuchus (a contemporary of Purussaurus), at 12 m, 9.5 m, 10.15 m, and 12 m, respectively.

Rhamphosuchus was previously regarded as a close relative of the modern false gharial within the subfamily Tomistominae. However, Tomistominae in its traditional sense is now known to be paraphyletic, and a 2022 study by Iijima and colleagues recovered Rhamphosuchus as a derived member of the subfamily Gavialinae instead. Rhamphosuchus probably had a more generalized predatory diet than the piscivory of other "tomistomines".

See also
 Gryposuchus, another huge prehistoric gavialid
 Largest prehistoric animals
 List of largest reptiles

References

Gavialidae
Pliocene crocodylomorphs
Pliocene reptiles of Asia
Prehistoric pseudosuchian genera
Fossil taxa described in 1840